Mount Kopere is a peak  northwest of Lyttelton Peak in the central part of the Cobham Range, Antarctica. It was named by the Holyoake, Cobham and Queen Elizabeth Ranges party of the New Zealand Geological Survey Antarctic Expedition (1964–65); "kopere" is a Māori word for arrow, and the peak's triangular cross section from most directions suggests an arrowhead.

References

Mountains of Oates Land